Vaccinium cespitosum (also, caespitosum), known as the dwarf bilberry, dwarf blueberry, or dwarf huckleberry, is a species of flowering shrub in the genus Vaccinium, which includes blueberries, huckleberries, and cranberries.

Description

Vaccinium cespitosum is a low-lying plant rarely reaching half a meter (1.5 feet) in height which forms a carpet-like stand in rocky mountainous meadows. The dwarf bilberry foliage is reddish-green to green and the flowers are tiny urn-shaped light pink cups less than a centimeter (>0.4 inches) wide.

The fruits are edible blue bilberries.

Distribution and habitat
Vaccinium cespitosum is widespread across much of Canada including all three Arctic territories, as well as the northern and western United States, Mexico, and Guatemala. Its native habitats include gravelly or rocky meadows and mountain slopes.

See also
 Huckleberry
 Vaccinium

References

External links

 Jepson Manual Treatment: Vaccinium cespitosum
 United States Department of Agriculture Plants Profile: Vaccinium cespitosum
 

cespitosum
Berries
Plants described in 1803
Flora of Subarctic America
Flora of Canada
Flora of the Northeastern United States
Flora of the North-Central United States
Flora of the Northwestern United States
Flora of the Southwestern United States
Flora of the South-Central United States
Flora of Northeastern Mexico
Flora of Central America